Dichomeris syringota is a moth in the family Gelechiidae. It was described by Edward Meyrick in 1926. It is found in Peru.

The forewings are rather dark grey with a broad costal band at the base occupying half of the wing but attenuated to a point at three-fourths, grey whitish mottled with grey, the dorsal area towards the base is also similarly suffused and between these a streak of blackish-fuscous suffusion along the fold from about one-sixth to two-fifths, with some undefined dark fuscous suffusion extending from this beneath the costal band to beyond the middle. There is a whitish dot on the end of the cell followed by a transverse fascia of obscure whitish irroration (sprinkling) terminated by a more distinct rather curved shade. The hindwings are grey, thinly scaled towards the base.

References

Moths described in 1926
syringota